This is the results breakdown of the local elections held in Andalusia on 22 May 2011. The following tables show detailed results in the autonomous community's most populous municipalities, sorted alphabetically.

Overall

City control
The following table lists party control in the most populous municipalities, including provincial capitals (shown in bold). Gains for a party are displayed with the cell's background shaded in that party's colour.

Municipalities

Alcalá de Guadaíra
Population: 71,740

Algeciras
Population: 116,417

Almería
Population: 190,013

Antequera
Population: 41,848

Benalmádena
Population: 61,383

Cádiz
Population: 125,826

Chiclana de la Frontera
Population: 78,591

Córdoba
Population: 328,547

Dos Hermanas
Population: 125,086

Écija
Population: 40,534

El Ejido
Population: 85,389

El Puerto de Santa María
Population: 88,503

Fuengirola
Population: 71,783

Granada
Population: 239,154

Huelva
Population: 149,310

Jaén
Population: 116,790

Jerez de la Frontera
Population: 208,896

La Línea de la Concepción
Population: 64,645

Linares
Population: 61,306

Málaga
Population: 568,507

Marbella
Population: 136,322

Morón de la Frontera
Population: 28,467

Motril
Population: 60,884

Ronda
Population: 36,909

Roquetas de Mar
Population: 85,808

San Fernando
Population: 96,689

Sanlúcar de Barrameda
Population: 66,541

Seville

Population: 704,198

Utrera
Population: 51,177

Vélez-Málaga
Population: 75,623

References

Andalusia
2011